Riverhead may refer to:

 River source, the headwaters of a river or stream

Geography
 Riverhead, Kent, England
 Riverhead (CDP), New York, United States
 Riverhead (town), New York, United States
 Riverhead (LIRR station), a Long Island Railroad station
 Riverhead, New Zealand
 Riverhead, Newfoundland and Labrador, Canada
 Riverhead, Nova Scotia, a community in the Canadian province of Nova Scotia

Business
 Riverhead Books, a division of Penguin Group
 Riverhead Networks, a computer security company
 Riverhead Raceway, an auto race track in Riverhead, New York

Media and entertainment
 Riverhead (album), by Goldenhorse, 2002
 Riverhead (film), a 2016 Canadian movie directed by Justin Oakey
 Riverhead (soundtrack), a soundtrack album from the film, by Ulver

See also
 Head of the River (disambiguation), several rowing competitions
 Head River, a river in southern Ontario